

About the Atlas LV3C 
The Atlas-Centaur was a United States expendable launch vehicle derived from the SM-65 Atlas D missile. Launches were conducted from Launch Complex 36 at the Cape Canaveral Air Force Station (CCAFS) in Florida.

Launch statistics

Launch Outcomes

Launch Pads

Target orbit

Launches

References 

Expendable space launch systems
Lists of rocket launches